"Real" is an extended play (EP) by English electronic music production duo Gorgon City. Its title single "Real" features vocals from Yasmin, and was released in the United Kingdom as a digital download on 17 February 2013. The song peaked at number 44 on the UK Singles Chart and number 7 on the UK Indie Chart, and appears on their debut studio album Sirens.

Track listing

Release history

Personnel
Gorgon City
 Foamo – production
 RackNRuin – production

Additional personnel
 Yasmin – vocals

References

Polydor Records EPs
2013 EPs
Gorgon City albums
Black Butter Records albums